Poloma is a village and municipality in Slovakia.

Poloma may also refer to:

 Margaret Poloma (born 1943), American sociologist, professor, and author 
 Poloma (moth), a genus of moths in the family Eupterotidae

See also
 Paloma (disambiguation)